Ingrid von Rosen (sometimes cited as Ingrid Bergman; 17 January 1930 – 20 May 1995) was a Swedish diarist who was married to Swedish film director Ingmar Bergman in the latter half of her life.

Biography
Born Ingrid Karlebo in Stockholm in 1930, her first marriage was to the Swedish count Jan-Carl von Rosen (m. 1953–1971). Her daughter by Ingmar Bergman was born in 1959. In 1971 she married Ingmar Bergman. Their marriage lasted until her death of stomach cancer in 1995, aged 65.

Her diary is a part of the biographical work Tre dagböcker (literally: Three diaries) published in 2004 by Ingmar Bergman and their daughter, author Maria von Rosen. The biography consists of their respective diary entries written around the time Ingrid von Rosen died, after a 24-year marriage to Bergman. In the foreword to the book, Bergman writes that he met Ingrid von Rosen in 1957 and had an on-and-off affair with her until 1969. During that period, Bergman went through two marriages, with Gun Grut and Käbi Laretei. He also had a relationship with actress Liv Ullmann.

Ingrid and Bergman's daughter, Maria von Rosen, was born in 1959, the same year Bergman divorced Grut and married Laretei. In Ingmar Bergman's autobiography he reveals he did not tell Maria he was her father until she was 22. Before publishing the book in 2004, he never publicly revealed that he was Maria's father. When he married Ingrid von Rosen in 1971, he had been married four times, and had eight other children, including a daughter with Liv Ullmann.

On 20 August 2007, her four children requested to have her grave and remains moved from the original site (Roslagsbro) to share a plot with her husband on Fårö. Applications to move graves are rare in Sweden, with fewer than ten applications granted each year. The request was granted on 24 October 2007 and the spousal couple's graves were brought together by the end of May 2008. The top line of the tombstone inscription reads "Ingrid Bergman", rather than "Ingrid von Rosen Bergman".

Further reading
Maria von Rosen and Ingmar Bergman, Tre dagböcker, Stockholm: Norstedt, 2004. 

1930 births
1995 deaths
Writers from Stockholm
Swedish diarists
Deaths from stomach cancer
Deaths from cancer in Sweden
Women diarists
20th-century Swedish women writers
20th-century non-fiction writers
20th-century diarists